The men's 50 metre rifle three positions competition at the 2006 Asian Games in Doha, Qatar was held on 7 December at the Lusail Shooting Range.

The men's 50 metre rifle three positions consists of the prone, standing and kneeling positions, fired in that order, with 3×40 shots for men.

The men's match has separate commands and times for each position, giving each shooter 45 minutes to complete the prone part, 75 minutes for the standing part, and 60 minutes for the kneeling part, including sighting shots for each part.

The top eight competitors reach the final, where the score zones are divided into tenths, giving up to 10.9 points for each shot. The men's final consists of ten shots from the standing position, with a time limit of 75 seconds per shot. The competition is won by the shooter who reaches the highest aggregate score (qualification + final, maximum 1309.0).

Zhang Fu of China won the gold medal with a new Asian Games record, his teammate Zhang Lei finished second and Gagan Narang of India won the bronze medal.

Schedule
All times are Arabia Standard Time (UTC+03:00)

Records

Results

Qualification

Final

References 

ISSF Results Overview
Qualification Results
Final Results

External links
Official website

Men Rifle 50 3P